Jelloway Creek is a stream in the U.S. state of Ohio.

Jelloway Creek was named for Tom Jelloway, a Native American chief.

See also
List of rivers of Ohio

References

Rivers of Ashland County, Ohio
Rivers of Knox County, Ohio
Rivers of Ohio
Native American history of Ohio